Sing to the Moon Tour is a worldwide concert tour by English recording artist, Laura Mvula. Visiting North America and Europe, the tour supports Mvula's debut studio album, Sing to the Moon.

Opening acts
KING (North America - Leg 1)
PHOX (North America - Leg 2)[Select venues]

Set list
"I Am the Black Gold of the Sun" (Intro)
"Like the Morning Dew"
"Let Me Fall"
"She"
"Flying without You"
"Sing to the Moon"
"Is There Anybody Out There?" (Contains excerpts of "One Love/People Get Ready")
"I Don't Know What the Weather Will Be"
"Diamonds"
"Father, Father"
"Can't Live with the World"
"Green Garden"
"See Line Woman"
"That's Alright"
"Jump Right Out"
"Make Me Lovely"
"Human Nature"

Tour dates

Personnel
Creative direction
Laura Mvula – show direction, main vocalist, keyboardist

Band
Troy Miller – musical director, drummer, xylophone
Dionne Douglas – violin, backing vocals
James Douglas – cello, backing vocals
Iona Thomas – harp, backing vocals
Karl Rasheed Abel – upright bass, bass guitar, backing vocals

References

2013 concert tours
2014 concert tours